The Venetian Plain, or Venetian-Friulian Plain ( or ) is a major geographical feature of Italy. It extends approximately from the River Adige to the River Isonzo, in a southwest-to-northeast direction, including almost all the flatlands of Veneto and Friuli. It is not properly related to the Po River basin, but it is often considered as part of the Po Valley since the flatlands of Veneto and Friuli do not drain into the Po, but they effectively combine into an unbroken plain. Sometimes, instead of the River Adige, the Euganei Hills and Berici Hills are considered to be its western border.

See also

Friuli
Po Valley
Triveneto
Veneto

Plains of Italy
Friuli
Landforms of Veneto